The Fiddle River is a medium-sized tributary of the Athabasca River, flowing into the river near the east gate of Jasper National Park in Alberta, Canada.  The Fiddle River forms at the base of Fiddle Pass, with meltwater from Mount Bryant, Mount Gregg, Mount Sir Harold Mitchel, and Mount Barry.  The river flows in a general northeast direction before its confluence with the Athabasca.  The Fiddle River parallels the road to the popular Miette Hotsprings for a portion of its course.

There are two competing stories for the naming of the Fiddle River (as well as Fiddle Peak, Fiddle Pass, and the Fiddle Range).  The first contends that wind flowing over the Fiddle Range with a certain speed and direction mimicks the sound of a #4 fiddle string.  The second story argues that the outline of the range resembles that of a violin.  The name Fiddle River first appeared in 1846.

Tributaries
Poachers Creek
Slide Creek
Sulphur Creek
O'Hagan Creek
Mystery Creek
Villeneuve Creek
Morris Creek
Ashlar Creek

See also
List of Alberta rivers

References

Rivers of Alberta